Nobleza ranchera ("Rural Chivalry") is a 1975 Mexican film. It stars Sara García, Verónica Castro and Juan Gabriel.

References

External links
 

Mexican drama films
1975 films
1970s Spanish-language films
1970s Mexican films